The 2010 European Men's Fistball Championship was held in Ermatingen (Switzerland) from August 27 to 29 with seven men's national teams: Austria, Catalonia, Czech Republic, Germany, Italy, Serbia and Switzerland.

Teams
Group A

Group B

First round

Group A

Group B

Semifinals classification
Match classification 4th group A - 1st group B

5th-7th places

Final round

Semifinals

Finals
3rd-4th places

Final

Final standings

External links
2010 European Championship official website
Results Austrian Federation
International Fistball Association

Fistball
European international sports competitions
Fistball